Université des Sciences Appliquées et Management (USAM) is a university located in Porto-Novo, Ouémé, Benin, Founded in 2003.

List of Faculties

Faculty of Legal, Administrative and Political
Faculty of Economics
Faculty of Management Sciences
Faculty of Health Sciences
Faculty of Arts and Social Sciences
Faculty of Agricultural Sciences
Faculty of Applied Sciences

References
https://web.archive.org/web/20161013210301/http://www.4icu.org/reviews/14658.htm
http://univusam.academia.edu/

External links
https://web.archive.org/web/20141222052458/http://www.univ-usam.org/ 
http://usam.iresi.ng 

Universities in Benin
Educational institutions established in 2003
2003 establishments in Benin